Harpos Concert Theatre is a music venue located at 14238 Harper Avenue, Detroit, Michigan, United States. It is known as a venue for heavy metal and industrial rock.

History
It was built in 1939 for the Wisper and Westman circuit as the Harper Theatre. It was built for about $290,000 and was designed in Art Moderne style by Charles N. Agree. There is an  vertical sign on the front of the theatre that spells out "HARPOS," adapting the old Harper Theater sign. There are murals in the lobby and auditorium by Thomas di Lorenzo.

It was converted into a disco club in the mid 70's and later transformed into a venue for heavy metal.

Bands that have performed there over the years have included Iron Maiden, U2, Poison, Vince Neil, Dio, Motörhead, Slayer, Megadeth, Judas Priest, Anthrax, Twisted Sister, Ted Nugent, Cinderella, Ratt, Dokken, Skid Row, Slipknot, Sevendust, Disturbed, Godsmack, Cheap Trick, Max Webster, Golden Earring, White Zombie, Danzig, The Misfits, Type O Negative, W.A.S.P., Brian Setzer, Paul Rodgers, Foghat, Rob Halford, Kick Axe, Robin Trower, Dead Kennedys, Mitch Ryder, Blue Öyster Cult, Alvin Lee, Bachman-Turner Overdrive, John Entwistle, INXS, Huey Lewis & The News, Eurythmics, Spin Doctors, Mighty Mighty Bosstones, Joan Jett, Ace Frehley, Sebastian Bach, Yngwie Malmsteen, Helix, Saxon, Night Ranger, Quiet Riot, Trixter, Slaughter, FireHouse, Jackyl, Y&T, Savatage, Kix, Shooting Star, Ian Hunter, Nazareth, Prong, Johnny Winter, Michael Schenker Group, Dream Theatre, Armored Saint, Molly Hatchet, Blackfoot, Joe Lynn Turner, Gwar, Powerman 5000, Dope, Hatebreed, Crossbreed, Coal Chamber, Mushroomhead, 40 Below Summer, Halloween The Heavy Metal Horror Show and many others.

Gary Moore performed here on June 23, 1984, during his Victims of the Future tour. Four songs of the live album We Want Moore! were recorded that evening and were released the same year.

Warrant recorded their live CD "Warrant Live 86-97" at Harpos on November 22, 1996.

Heavy metal band Corrosion of Conformity filmed their live DVD Live Volume at Harpos on April 20, 2001.

Black Label Society filmed their live DVD Boozed, Broozed & Broken-Boned at Harpos on September 14, 2002; notably, during the recording of that show, the bar ran out of alcohol.

Hatebreed filmed their live DVD at Harpos.

Hip-hop acts who have performed there
The venue has also hosted shows for hardcore hip hop artists such as Insane Clown Posse, Snoop Dogg, LL Cool J, Montell Jordan, Lil' Kim, Run DMC, Salt-n-Pepa, Vanilla Ice, Tech N9ne, Hopsin, Gorilla Zoe, Twista, Boondox, Twiztid, and King Gordy.

Esham, the originator of Detroit's own Acid Rap, who some consider to be the godfather of Detroit hip hop, is the first known rap artist to perform a hip hop show at this club in the early 1990s.

References

External links

Culture of Detroit
Cinemas and movie theaters in Michigan
Concert halls in Michigan
Theatres in Detroit
Movie palaces
Music venues in Michigan
Event venues established in 1939
1939 establishments in Michigan
Charles N. Agree buildings